Talagang District (Urdu/) is a District of Punjab province of Pakistan. It is located in the North of the Punjab province. Talagang district is bordered by Khushab to its South, Attock to its North, Chakwal to its East, and Mianwali to its West. The district was created out of parts of Chakwal District on 13 October 2022.  It was created after four new districts were created alongside Talagang.

Mossawer Ahmad khan Niazi was first Deputy Commissioner of the District.
There are two Municipal Committees(Lawa, Talagang)in District Talagang .
District Council Talagang has also been notified in the official Gazzette of the Punjab.

Administrative division
The district is contains the following tehsils:

 Lawa
 Multan Khurd
 Talagang

References

External links
 Municipal Committee Talagang at Local Government and Community Development Department

Districts of Punjab, Pakistan